The Arts Council of Mendocino County (ACMC) is the Mendocino County, California arts council serving the arts in the Mendocino area. This council is under the California state arts council the California Arts Council.

The Mendocino Ballet is connected with this organization, funding it in part with ticket sales.

The Arts Council of Mendocino County runs under the California state arts council, the California Arts Council (CAC).

Executive Staff
Alyssum Wier - Executive Director, Since 2010 
Hal Wagenet - President
Trudy McCreanor - Vice-President

External links
Arts Council of Mendocino County website

Mendocino
Mendocino County, California